Gumercindo Álvarez Sotelo (born 13 January 1962) is a Mexican politician from the National Action Party. From 2000 to 2003 he served as Deputy of the LVIII Legislature of the Mexican Congress representing Morelos.

References

1962 births
Living people
Politicians from Morelos
National Action Party (Mexico) politicians
21st-century Mexican politicians
Deputies of the LVIII Legislature of Mexico
Members of the Chamber of Deputies (Mexico) for Morelos